The Manouane River, a tributary of the Peribonka River, flows in unorganized territory of Mont-Valin, Quebec, in the administrative region of Saguenay-Lac-Saint-Jean, in Quebec, Canada.

Forestry is the main economic activity of this valley; recreational tourism activities, second; hydroelectricity, third.

Forest Roads R0258 (North-South) and R0251 serve the Manouane River Valley, the Georges River and the Manouaniche River.

The surface of the Péribonka River is usually frozen from late November to early April, however, safe ice movement is generally from mid-December to late March.

Geography

The Manouane Lake (altitude:  area) is the headwater body of the Manouane River.

From the dam at the mouth of Manouane Lake, the Manouane River flows on  entirely in forest areas, according to the following segments :

Upper Manouane River course (segment of )

  easterly forming a hook to the north crossing Lake Opitoune;
  southerly crossing Lake Opitounis;
  southerly forming a hook to the northeast and crossing Otapoco Lake;
  southwesterly through Lake Shortcut;
  to the southwest, then to the south, collecting the outlet of Lake Panache and Lake Radio, as well as curving towards the east at the end of the segment, until "Rivière aux Outardes" (coming from the East);
  south to the outlet of Lake Grand Détour (coming from the North-East);
  southwesterly to a bend in the river corresponding to the outlet of Portage Lake and Suzanne Lake;
  to the NW by cutting off the R0251 forest road by collecting the Naja River (coming from the South and draining the Paul Lake) and the landfill (coming from South) of Lake Grand Nénuphar, as well as the creek Milot (coming from the North), until the confluence of the Little Manouane River (coming from the North);

Lower Manouane River course (segment of )

  to the South, crossing in particular Lac Duhamel, to the confluence of the Castor-Qui-Cale River (coming from the North-East);
  south, to the confluence of the Houlière River (coming from the northwest);
  south, to the confluence of the George River (coming from the East);
  southerly to the confluence of the Alma River (from the Northwest);
  south, to the confluence of the Manouaniche River (coming from the South-East);
  southwesterly to the mouth of the river.

The mouth of the Manouane River flows on the east bank of the Péribonka River, that is to say:
  west of the Pipmuacan Reservoir;
  north-west of the dam at the mouth of Lake Pamouscachiou;
  south-east of the dam at the mouth of Lake Péribonka which is crossed by the Péribonka River;
  north of the mouth of the Péribonka River (confluence with lac Saint-Jean;
  north of the mouth of lac Saint-Jean.

Toponymy
The toponym "Manouan" is indicated on a map of 1705. This toponymic designation was inscribed in 1945 and approved on November 4, 1948. This place name has known several spellings: Manuan, Manowan, Manouan. This name is from Montagnais source, Manauan Shakaikan meaning "lake where we collect eggs". This designation turns out to be a derivative of manneu, meaning "he removes it by hand", from uau, egg, and shakaikan, lake. It would be a custom for the Montagnais to collect the eggs of birds in the islands and on the shores of this lake.

The toponym "Rivière Manouane" was inscribed on December 5, 1968, at the Bank of Place Names of the Commission de toponymie du Québec.

See also

References

External links

 Canadian Council for Geographic Education page with a series of articles on the history of the Saguenay River.

Rivers of Saguenay–Lac-Saint-Jean